Julia Hillbrick Gaines is an American percussionist and academic. As of 2021, she is the director of the School of Music at the University of Missouri in Columbia, Missouri. Gaines has performed as a soloist worldwide and released her first album, Tiger Dance in 2017. She was on the International Board of Directors of the Percussive Arts Society, eventually serving as Secretary. Gaines has performed with the Missouri Symphony, the Oklahoma City Philharmonic, the Fox Valley Symphony, and the Green Bay Symphony Orchestra. She has served as Associate Editor for Percussive Notes, a scholarly journal of the Percussive Arts Society and is currently Associate Editor of the Keyboard Percussion section.

Early life and education
Julia Gaines was born in 1969 in Bellevue, Washington, but by second grade had moved to Moscow, Idaho where she began learning the piano, eventually switching to percussion. She graduated from Moscow High School in 1987 and went on to attend the Lawrence University Conservatory of Music in Appleton, Wisconsin. Gaines was a member of the Santa Clara Vanguard Drum and Bugle Corps, which won a national title in 1989. She would go on to attain a master's degree from Eastman School of Music and would receive a PhD from the University of Oklahoma.

University of Missouri
Gaines joined the faculty of the University of Missouri School of Music in 1996. She would serve as professor of percussion for eighteen years, eventually becoming Director of the School of Music in 2014, after the departure of Robert Shay. She is a member of Pi Kappa Lambda.

Works
Sequential Studies (BOOK 1) for Four-Mallet Marimba: Level 1: the very beginning. Portland, Oregon, Tapspace, 2018.
Sequential Studies (BOOK 2) for Four-Mallet Marimba: Level 2: the heart of the chorale. Portland, Oregon, Tapspace, 2019.

References

External links
 University of Missouri School of Music profile

American women percussionists
American marimbists
University of Missouri School of Music faculty
University of Oklahoma alumni
Lawrence University alumni
Eastman School of Music alumni
1969 births
Living people
American percussionists